Dalgliesh is a crime drama television series developed by New Pictures based on the Adam Dalgliesh novels by PD James. Bertie Carvel stars as the title character, an enigmatic detective–poet. The six-part series premiered on Acorn TV on 1 November 2021 in the United States followed by a Channel 5 premiere on 4 November in the United Kingdom.

Dalgliesh was officially renewed for a second installment in March 2022, followed by a third confirmed that July.

Premise
A published poet and recent widower, Detective Chief Inspector Adam Dalgliesh employs his empathy and insight to plumb the darker depths of the human psyche while investigating complex crimes in mid-1970s England.

Cast
 Bertie Carvel as Adam Dalgliesh
 Jeremy Irvine as DS Charles Masterson
 Carlyss Peer as DS Kate Miskin

Episodes

Series 1 (2021)

Series 2 (2023)

Production

Development and casting
New Pictures secured the rights to adapt three of James' novels across six episodes with future seasons outlined. It was announced in October 2020 that Channel 5 and Acorn TV (via Acorn Media Enterprises) had commissioned the series with Bertie Carvel in the titular role and each story having its own cast. A creative team of mostly women would be behind the series, with Helen Edmundson writing, Jill Robertson directing, Georgie Fallon producing, and Elaine Pyke executive producing.

Filming
Principal photography for the first series was going to take place in December 2020 but was postponed to 2021. The project received funding from All3Media International and Northern Ireland Screen.

Production on the second series is expected to take place in the summer of 2022.

Release
Acorn TV released a trailer for the series at the end of September 2021. On 22 October, Channel 5 announced episodes would air biweekly on Thursdays and Fridays.

References

External links

2021 British television series debuts
2020s British drama television series
2020s British crime television series
2020s British mystery television series
Acorn TV original programming
British detective television series
Channel 5 (British TV channel) original programming
Television series set in the 1970s
Television shows based on British novels
English-language television shows
Television series by All3Media
Helen Edmundson